WCGQ (107.3 FM, "Q107-3") is a radio station broadcasting a Top 40 (CHR) music format. WCGQ is licensed to serve the community of Columbus, Georgia, United States.  Its studios are co-located with four other sister stations on Wynnton Road in Columbus east of downtown, and its transmitter is located in Phenix City, Alabama.

Programming

Former
Notable former on-air personalities include Kris Earl Phillips, The Smoker (Scott Howitt), Bill Lenky (Bill Lee), O'Henry Allen,  P.J. Walker, Merlin Jones, Jefferson Keyes, Al Haynes who was inducted into the Georgia Radio Hall of Fame in 2014 he's the first and the only "Hall Of Famer" in the city (now programming sister station WRCG-FM), Randy Reeves, Chuck Bear, Joe Cook, Scott Miller, Lulu, Spikey Mike, Bob Raleigh,  Rick Casey  (Ralph Carroll), Shelby Guest, Lee "Lee Baby" McCard, Bob McGee, Brian Waters, Dave Kelly, James Steele (James Gilmore), Mark "Mark in the Dark" Ross, Dave Arwood, Bear O'Bryan, Jeff Tate, Robert Cunningham, Jeff Michaels, Leo Davis, Mark Gunn, Andy Woods, and Stella (Joe Mclure).

Ownership
In December 2002, McClure Broadcasting, Inc., (Chuck McClure Jr., president) reached an agreement to sell this station to Archway Broadcasting Group (Al Vicente, president/CEO). This was part of a four-station deal, along with WRLD-FM, WRCG, and WKCN, for a reported combined sale price of $15 million. At the time of the sale, WCGQ carried an adult contemporary music format.

History

WGBA-FM and WHYD-FM

WGBA-FM signed on in 1964. The station was owned by WGBA, Inc. It was relaunched as WHYD-FM "Hydee" in 1971; it aired an automated country music format.

WCGQ

At 6 a.m. on December 26, 1973, WHYD-FM became WCGQ and flipped from country to Top 40.

The first on-the-air announcement on WCGQ was made by WCGQ start-up consulting Program Director, David Tate: "This is WCGQ, Columbus, Georgia, 'The New 107-Q', where the Rock revolution starts NOW". Then, Tate played the first musical selection ever broadcast on WCGQ, Revolution, recorded by the British pop band, The Beatles.

Indeed, a Rock revolution did begin at WCGQ-FM that day. WCGQ trounced its direct competitor, WDAK, in only 4 months. In the April/May, 1974 Arbitron ratings Radio Market Report for Columbus, GA, WCGQ became the leading FM popular music radio station in the Columbus, GA metropolitan area.

107-Q's earliest musical style was marked by a decidedly eclectic, "left-of-center", musical mixture, featuring playlists with artists like David Essex, Ian Thomas, Bachman-Turner Overdrive (which was called, "underground" music at the time) and Jimi Hendrix. Also, WCGQ played songs by a number of "Southern Underground" bands and singers, including The Allman Brothers' Band, Black Oak Arkansas, Wet Willie and others. "Southern Rock" was crystallizing in the world of pop music at the very moment of WCGQ's inception.

This "left-field" strategy was apparently by-design, in order to give WCGQ the initial veneer of being an "underground" FM station. But the presentation-style of WCGQ was purely in the "Top 40" mold, with a handful of Top 40 "shotgun", short, singing identifiers ("jingles") and high-energy radio announcers, often referred to in the radio trade as, "Boss Jocks".

Kris Earl Phillips was the 6pm-10pm on-air host during the earliest days of WCGQ. Phillips eventually reached radio's most prominent Top 40 station, according to the Arbitron radio ratings, WHTZ-FM/New York, NY (a.k.a. "Z-100"), in 1991.

In April, 1974, due to a business dispute between WCGQ management and David Tate's employer, Bill Parris Programming of Washington, DC, Tate was ordered to withdraw prematurely from the 107-Q project and Kris Earl Phillips actually guided 107-Q as Program Director through its first ratings period. But, by then, the start-up strategy had largely been set by Parris and Tate.

Later, WCGQ was programmed directly by William B. Parris, of Bill Parris Programming of Washington, D.C. (who initially hired Tate to execute the 107-Q start-up) and the station took on a decidedly more "Urban" tenor. As a result, WCGQ attracted a large number of African-American listeners in WCGQ's city-of-license, Columbus, GA.

By 1975, under the direction of Parris, WCGQ became the overall number one radio station in the Columbus, GA radio listening market. WDAK-AM's audience ratings fell into obscurity during the period after 1975.

In the late 1970s, WCGQ increased its transmitting power to 100,000 watts and changed its operating frequency from 107.7 mHz to 107.3 mHz, in order to more effectively serve the growing Columbus metropolitan area. The station also began airing American Top 40 with Casey Kasem on Sunday mornings in 1977 and later began airing Rick Dees Weekly Top 40 on Sunday evenings in 1984. In the late 1990s, WCGQ changed its over-the-air nickname from "107-Q" to its current nickname, "Q107.3". Curiously, the WCGQ "listener request line" telephone number still refers to its original FCC-allocated operating frequency, 107.7 mHz: (706) 322-1077. This studio telephone number has remained unchanged since the station originally signed-on in 1973.

Notable Industry Accomplishments
WCGQ holds the distinction of broadcasting the "Top 40" radio format longer than any other American commercial radio station: almost 40 years and still going.

Acquisitions and Mergers
On July 31, 2008, local investment group PMB Broadcasting LLC (headed up by Jim Martin) purchased this station along with Columbus-area sister stations WRLD-FM, WRCG, WCGQ, and WKCN from Archway Broadcasting Group LLC for a reported sale price of $7.2 million. At the time of the sale, the station carried a contemporary hit radio music format.

References

External links

CGQ
Contemporary hit radio stations in the United States
Radio stations established in 1974